MWG  may refer to:

 Milky Way, the "Milky Way Galaxy"
 Metadata Working Group, a company consortium to advance the interoperability of metadata stored in digital media
 Manhattan Waterfront Greenway
 Military World Games
 meters, water gauge (m wg)